Robert "Rob" Nelson (born August 13, 1979, Denver, Colorado) is an American biologist, documentary filmmaker, and television personality.  He is a regular contributor to the Science Channel documentary series What on Earth? Starting in 2017, he was the host and participating researcher of the Science Channel documentary series Secrets of the Underground, whose goal was to examine long-held legendary mysteries that lie beneath the surfaces of streets, buildings, earth, salt and fresh water, etc. Nelson also cohosted the popular hit Animal Planet show, Life After Chernobyl in 2015. He holds a B.S. in biology and marine science from the University of Miami, a M.S. degree from the University of Hawaiʻi at Mānoa, and a M.F.A. from the Montana State University.

He received an Emmy Award in 2014 for his work on Mysteries of the Driftless, a documentary film about the Driftless Area. He later filmed a second feature of the Mysteries of the Driftless in 2018. 

Nelson's current work includes being the director of Untamed Science where he hosts a YouTube show by the same name. His show works closely with the North Carolina Zoo to help tell untold animal stories.

References

1979 births
Living people
21st-century American biologists
Rosenstiel School of Marine and Atmospheric Science alumni
University of Hawaiʻi at Mānoa alumni
Montana State University alumni
American documentary filmmakers
News & Documentary Emmy Award winners
American television personalities
Male television personalities
Scientists from Denver